Dease-Martineau House, Trading Post and Oxcart Trail Segments is a historic district which was listed on the National Register of Historic Places in 2017.

References

National Register of Historic Places in Pembina County, North Dakota
Roads and trails on the National Register of Historic Places in North Dakota
Houses on the National Register of Historic Places in North Dakota
Trading posts in the United States
Trails and roads in the American Old West
Transportation in Pembina County, North Dakota